Simone Guerri (born 27 June 1982) is an Italian footballer. He spent entire professional career in Serie C.

Biography
Born in Arezzo, Tuscany, Guerri started his career at AC Fiorentina. After the club bankrupted, he remained in Florence as member of newly formed successor Florentia Viola (later ACF Fiorentina). In January 2003, he left for Trento. He then involved into a swap deals between Trento, Mantova and Montevarchi, which Guerri left for Montevarchi.

He then played for Aglianese, Imolese and  Castelnuovo in Serie C2. In 2007, he was signed by Prima Divisione (Serie C1) team Pistoiese and left the club after the club went bankrupt. In 2009–10 season he played for another Prima Divisione team Figline but the team also bankrupted after the season.

In August 2010, he was signed by Barletta.

International career
He played for Italy U16 team (now Italy U17) at 1999 UEFA European Under-16 Football Championship qualifying. He also played once for Italy U17 (now U18), the feeder team of U18 (now Italy U19).

References

External links
 FIGC National Team Archive 

1982 births
Sportspeople from Arezzo
Living people
Italian footballers
Italy youth international footballers
Association football midfielders
ACF Fiorentina players
Montevarchi Calcio Aquila 1902 players
U.S. Pistoiese 1921 players
A.S.D. Barletta 1922 players
A.S. Gubbio 1910 players
Paganese Calcio 1926 players
A.C.N. Siena 1904 players
Serie C players
Footballers from Tuscany